The Federal Bureau of Investigation website in 2014 stated that there were some 33,000 gangs in the United States which they classified as street gangs, motorcycle gangs or prison gangs. While some gangs are multi-ethnic, many criminal enterprises are organized along racial lines and restrict membership to individuals of particular ethnicities or races.

Notable criminal gangs include:

By ethnic origin

African-American

Caribbean

Caucasian and white supremacist

East Asian

Eastern European

Hispanic

Irish-American

Italian-American

Jewish

Indigenous American
Native Mob

Pacific Islander

Southeast Asian

West Asian

Outlaw motorcycle clubs

Prison
Membership in this group may overlap other groups above.

See also

 List of criminal gangs in Los Angeles
 List of California street gangs
 Crime in the United States

References

United States
Gangs
Gangs
Gangs